Serlachius is a Finnish surname. Notable people with the surname include:

Allan Serlachius (1870–1935), Finnish lawyer, professor, and politician
Viveca Serlachius (1923–1993), Finnish-born Swedish actress

Finnish-language surnames